Carrie Stevens (born May 1, 1969) is an American model and actress. She was Playboy's Playmate of the Month for June 1997.

Early life
Carrie Stevens was born in Buffalo, New York and grew up in Hardwick, Massachusetts. Later she studied journalism at Memphis State University. Growing up, her family composted and grew their own organic fruits and vegetables, milked goats to make cheese, and kept chickens for their eggs. Her father was a research scientist and her mother was an artist. When her parents divorced, she went with her mother to Memphis, Tennessee.

Career

Movies and television
After being spotted in a dentist's waiting room by a Hollywood talent agent, Stevens first television appearance was on an episode of the daytime soap opera Days of Our Lives in 1992. She has appeared in numerous television shows, including the Sci Fi Channel's Black Scorpion along with an episode of Wild On! for E! Entertainment Television. In addition, she's had small roles in Pacific Blue and Beverly Hills, 90210, the daytime TV drama Days of Our Lives and 18 Wheels of Justice. She guest starred on Jake in Progress and Two and a Half Men.

Early in her acting career Stevens appears in several low budget straight-to-video erotic thrillers such as Dead End (1992), Sins of Desire (1993) with Tanya Roberts and Gail Thackray, Point of Seduction: Body Chemistry III (1994) with Morgan Fairchild, and Jane Street (1996).

In 2001, Stevens had a small roles in several movies including Vegas, City of Dreams, Rock Star with Mark Wahlberg and Jennifer Aniston, and Longshot with NSYNC and Britney Spears, as well as a lead role in another low budget thriller called Head Games. This was followed up with small supporting roles in The Backlot Murders (horror), Cruel Game (thriller), Who's Your Daddy? (comedy) in 2002, Hollywoo in 2011, and the 2013 movie Birdemic 2: The Resurrection. She was featured in the Third Eye Blind video for “Never Let You Go” from their 1999 CD release Blue.

Modeling
Steven's modelling career began with local modeling in the Memphis region. After moving to California she appeared in a few print ads and commercials. She then got her big modeling break when selected as Playboy'''s Playmate of The Month for June 1997. She later appeared in the March 1999 Playboy Special Edition Playmates in Bed – both on the cover and in a photo-shoot inside. Stevens was then the cover model for the Fall 2002 issue of Gene Simmons' magazine, Gene Simmons Tongue which also included a feature article, "Carrie Stevens: Confessions of a Rock Starlet". She has also appeared in Cosmopolitan, Glamour, Allure, and Women's Fitness.

Writing
Stevens wrote a monthly column for Hot Mom's Club magazine.  In 2020, Stevens published UNRATED: Revelations of a Rock 'n' Roll Centerfold - her memoir of her sex life from her boyfriend Eric Carr, the drummer of KISS, to Sultans and Billionaires.

Other ventures
Stevens founded the online green fashion magazine Envi-Image. She had several fellow Playmates model clothing for her. The website is now defunct, but when it was in operation it provided coverage of the green lifestyle and showcased environmentally friendly apparel, jewelry, make-up, hair and skincare products. Stevens also founded another website called PlaymatesforthePlanet.com which promoted environmental and green efforts.

Stevens also owns Carrie Stevens Infamous Family Fudge which sells fudge online. Launched in 2014, the company's products are inspired by her grandmother's recipes for fudge.

Personal life
In 1987, at the age of 17, Stevens met Eric Carr, then-drummer of the rock band Kiss who was 37 at the time. She spent nearly four years in a relationship with Carr until his death in 1991, and was interviewed at length for the 2011 book The Eric Carr Story.  She now lives in Los Angeles with her son Jaxon, born from a subsequent relationship with her ex-boyfriend, film director Stephen Herek whom she met during the filming of Rock Star''.

References

External links

Steven's Fudge Company

1969 births
Living people
Actresses from Buffalo, New York
1990s Playboy Playmates
21st-century American women